Shuangta District is a district of Chaoyang City, Liaoning, People's Republic of China.

Administrative divisions
There are ten subdistricts, two towns and two townships in the district.

Subdistricts
Nanta Subdistrict
Beita Subdistrict
Guangming Subdistrict
Linghe Subdistrict
Qianjin Subdistrict Subdistrict
Zhanqian Subdistrict
Longshan Subdistrict
Yanbei Subdistrict
Hongqi Subdistrict
Lingfeng Subdistrict

Towns
Talagao,
Taohuatu

Townships
Changbaoyingzi Township
Sunjiawan Township

References

External links

County-level divisions of Liaoning
Chaoyang, Liaoning